Taichung Japanese School is a Japanese international school in Daya District, Taichung, Taiwan in the Republic of China.

Unlike the enrollments of the Japanese schools in Taipei and Kaohsiung, the enrollment of the Taichung Japanese School increased between 1990 and 2010.

See also
 Japanese people in China
Republic of China-aligned Chinese international schools in Japan:
 Osaka Chinese School
 Tokyo Chinese School
 Yokohama Overseas Chinese School

References
  Dohi, Yutaka (土肥 豊; Osaka University of Comprehensive Children Education). "The Present Situation and the Problems of the Japanese Schools in Taiwan" (台湾の日本人学校の現状と課題 ; Archive). Journal of Osaka University of Comprehensive Children Education (大阪総合保育大学紀要) (5), 153-172, 2011-03-20. Osaka University of Comprehensive Children Education. See profile at CiNii. English abstract available.  Available from the Osaka University of Comprehensive Children Education Library.

Notes

Further reading

Not available online:
 Ikezaki, Yatsuo (池崎 八生; Oita University教育福祉科学部) and Kimie Ikezaki (池崎 喜美恵 Ikezaki Kimie; Tokyo Gakugei University生活科学学科). "Actual condition of industrial arts and home economics, information education in The Japanese school(Taipei, Taichu)" (日本人学校における技術・家庭科教育および情報教育の現状(第1報) : 台北・台中日本人学校の中学部の生徒を対象に ). The Research Bulletin of the Faculty of Education and Welfare Science, Oita University (大分大学教育福祉科学部研究紀要) 23(2), 381-394, 2001-10. Oita University. See profile at CiNii. See profile at Oita University Library (大分大学学術情報拠点).
 大野 弘隆. "台中日本人学校再建十周年記念式典." 交流 (838), 37-39, 2011-01. 交流協会. See profile at CiNii.

Reports from former employees:
 小波津 繁雄 (前台中日本人学校:沖縄県那覇市立城北中学校). "台中日本人学校の特色ある教育活動 (第7章 学校経営)." 在外教育施設における指導実践記録 32, 119-122, 2009-10-12. Tokyo Gakugei University. See profile at CiNii.
 上田 陽一郎 (前台中日本人学校:島根県益田市立小野中学校). "台中日本人学校における外国語活動の指導とその実践 : 現地採用職員との英会話授業の試み (第4章 総合的な学習)." 在外教育施設における指導実践記録 32, 65-68, 2009-10-12. Tokyo Gakugei University. See profile at CiNii.
 平野 善浩 (前台中日本人学校:福岡県大野城市立大野東中学校). "台中日本人学校における国際理解教育の推進 : 現地社会・学校との交流を通して(国際理解教育・現地理解教育)." 在外教育施設における指導実践記録 33, 159-162, 2010-12-24. Tokyo Gakugei University. See profile at CiNii.

External links

  Taichung Japanese School
  Taichung Japanese School
  Taichung Japanese School (Archive)

International schools in Taichung
Japanese international schools in Taiwan
Taichung